Sydenham Elnathan Ancona (November 20, 1824 – June 20, 1913) was an American educator and politician who served three terms as a Democratic member of the U.S. House of Representatives from Pennsylvania from 1861 to 1867.

Life and career
Ancona was born near Lititz, Pennsylvania. His father, Moses Ancona, came from a British Sephardic Jewish family, and his paternal grandmother was a member of the prominent Montefiore family. He moved to Berks County, Pennsylvania, in 1826 with his parents, who settled near Sculls Hill, Pennsylvania.  He attended public and private schools, and taught school.  He moved in 1856 to Reading, Pennsylvania, where he entered the employ of the Reading Company and served as a member of the Board of Education.

Congress
Ancona was elected as a Democrat to the Thirty-seventh, Thirty-eighth, and Thirty-ninth Congresses.  He was an unsuccessful candidate for renomination in 1866.

Later life and career
After leaving Congress, he became engaged in the trust, fire-insurance, and relief-association businesses in Reading.  

He was a delegate to the 1880 Democratic National Convention at Cincinnati, Ohio. During a visit to the Capitol at Washington, D.C., in 1912 he was tendered a reception on the floor of the House of Representatives, because he was at the time the last surviving Member of the Thirty-seventh Congress which had been assembled at the extraordinary session called by Abraham Lincoln on July 4, 1861.

He was engaged in banking and in the insurance business until his death in Reading in 1913. He is interred in Reading's Charles Evans Cemetery.

Sources

The Political Graveyard
RootsWeb entry

1824 births
1913 deaths
Burials at Charles Evans Cemetery
Politicians from Reading, Pennsylvania
Democratic Party members of the United States House of Representatives from Pennsylvania
People from Lititz, Pennsylvania
19th-century American politicians

Jewish members of the United States House of Representatives